Yu Zeping (born 23 December 1999) is a Chinese professional footballer player who currently plays for China League Two club Inner Mongolia Caoshangfei, on loan from Zibo Cuju.

Club career
Yu Zeping would play for the Guangzhou R&F F.C. youth team before being promoted to their satellite team called R&F who were allowed to play within the Hong Kong Premier League. He would make his debut in the Hong Kong Sapling Cup on 1 March 2019 against Tai Po FC in a 3-1 victory where he came on as a substitute for Hou Junjie. The following season he would remain in Hong Kong and was loaned to second tier football club North District

Career statistics

References

External links

Living people
Chinese footballers
Chinese expatriate footballers
Association football midfielders
Hong Kong Premier League players
Hong Kong First Division League players
China League Two players
R&F (Hong Kong) players
Expatriate footballers in Hong Kong
Chinese expatriate sportspeople in Hong Kong
1999 births
Guangxi Pingguo Haliao F.C. players